William McAdam (7 August 1886 – 22 April 1952) was a British politician.

McAdam was educated in Ecclefechan, then became a worker on the railways.  He served in the British Army during World War I, then returned to his former career, becoming active in the National Union of Railwaymen (NUR).  He rose to become branch secretary, then a member of the union's National Executive Committee, and also its district auditor.

McAdam also became active in the Labour Party, standing unsuccessfully in the 1935 Edinburgh West by-election, and in Salford North at the 1935 United Kingdom general election.  However, he won the seat at the 1945 United Kingdom general election, serving until 1950, when he retired.  He also spent time on the Scottish Executive of the Labour Party.

References

External links 
 

1886 births
1952 deaths
UK MPs 1945–1950
Labour Party (UK) MPs for English constituencies
National Union of Railwaymen-sponsored MPs
Members of the Parliament of the United Kingdom for Salford North